The McKinley County Courthouse in Gallup, New Mexico, was built in 1938–39.  It was listed on the National Register of Historic Places in 1989.

It was designed by El Paso, Texas, architects Trost & Trost. Its interior includes major works of WPA art.

References

Courthouses in New Mexico
National Register of Historic Places in McKinley County, New Mexico
Mission Revival architecture in New Mexico
Government buildings completed in 1939
1939 establishments in New Mexico